Chen Tien-Wen (born 1 June 1978) is a retired Taiwanese athlete who competed mostly in the 200 metres and 400 metres hurdles. He is the national record holder in both events. He competed at three consecutive World Championships starting in 1999, as well as the 2000 Summer Olympics. He was the gold medallist at the 2001 East Asian Games and has won bronze medals at the Asian Games, Summer Universiade and the Asian Athletics Championships.

Competition record

Personal bests
Outdoor
400 metres – 46.74 (Tainan 1998)
400 metres hurdles – 48.63 (Beijing 2001) NR
Indoor
200 metres – 21.82 (Maebashi 1999) NR

References

1978 births
Living people
Taiwanese male hurdlers
Taiwanese male sprinters
Olympic athletes of Taiwan
Athletes (track and field) at the 2000 Summer Olympics
Asian Games medalists in athletics (track and field)
Athletes (track and field) at the 1998 Asian Games
Athletes (track and field) at the 2002 Asian Games
World Athletics Championships athletes for Chinese Taipei
Universiade medalists in athletics (track and field)
Asian Games bronze medalists for Chinese Taipei
Medalists at the 1998 Asian Games
Universiade bronze medalists for Chinese Taipei
20th-century Taiwanese people